Westhafen Tower is a  30-storey skyscraper in the Gutleutviertel district of Frankfurt, Germany. The building was designed by the architects Schneider & Schumacher and was completed in 2004. The tower, whose name literally means "West Port Tower", is one of the first buildings at the former West Port.

Construction 
From the outside, the building is shaped like a cylinder, but the storeys are square-shaped, creating 18 conservatories between the interior and exterior. Each of the 30 floors above ground has a rentable area of approximately 820 square metres. One of the architectural features is the rhomboid facade structure, with 3556 triangular panes of glass forming the outer skin.

The structure of the building's glass facade resembles the ribbed surface of a typical Frankfurtian cider glass. Therefore, the building is popularly called das Gerippte, literally meaning "the Ribbed". (see Geripptes (de))

A portion of the triangular segments of the glass can be automatically opened for ventilation purposes in the bottom corner. The floors are heated with under the windows recessed convectors as the cooling is done via a cooling ceiling.

Tenants 
Westhafen Tower houses the headquarters of the European Insurance and Occupational Pensions Authority.

See also 
 List of tallest buildings in Frankfurt
 List of tallest buildings in Germany

References

External links 

 Official web site
 Westhafen Tower in the SKYLINE ATLAS, having facts and photos

Skyscrapers in Frankfurt
Office buildings completed in 2004
Skyscraper office buildings in Germany